Antibes station (French: Gare d'Antibes) is a railway station located in Antibes, Alpes-Maritimes, southern France. The station is located on the Marseille–Ventimiglia railway. The train services are operated by SNCF.

Train services
The following services currently call at the station:

High speed services (TGV) Paris - (Marseille) - Cannes - Nice (- Monaco - Menton)
High speed services (TGV)  Lyon - Avignon - Marseille - Cannes - Nice
Regional services (TER Provence-Alpes-Côte d'Azur) Marseille - Toulon - Cannes - Nice
Local services (TER Provence-Alpes-Côte d'Azur) Cannes - Antibes - Nice - Monaco - Menton - Ventimiglia
Local services (TER Provence-Alpes-Côte d'Azur) Grasse - Cannes - Antibes - Nice - Monaco - Menton - Ventimiglia

See also 

 List of SNCF stations in Provence-Alpes-Côte d'Azur

References

External links
TER Provence-Alpes-Côte d'Azur
Timetables for Thello EuroCity

Railway stations in Alpes-Maritimes
Gare Antibes
TER Provence-Alpes-Côte-d'Azur